Pheasant Rump 68 is an Indian reserve of the Pheasant Rump Nakota First Nation in Saskatchewan. It is 10 kilometres north of Kisbey. In the 2016 Canadian Census, it recorded a population of 56 living in 11 of its 18 total private dwellings.

References

Indian reserves in Saskatchewan
Division No. 1, Saskatchewan